Men's Super G World Cup 1986/1987

Final point standings

In Men's Super G World Cup 1986/87 all five results count, but no athlete was able to collect points in all five races. Pirmin Zurbriggen won the cup with only one win.

References
 fis-ski.com

World Cup
FIS Alpine Ski World Cup men's Super-G discipline titles